Hasanlu is an archaeological site near Lake Urmia, Iran.

Hasanlu may also refer to various places in Iran:
 Hasanlu, Ardabil
 Hasanlu, East Azerbaijan
 Hasanlu, Naqadeh, West Azerbaijan Province
 Hasanlu, Oshnavieh, West Azerbaijan Province
 Hasanlu, Shahin Dezh, West Azerbaijan Province
 Hasanlu, Urmia, West Azerbaijan Province
 Hasanlu, Zanjan
 Hasanlu Rural District, in West Azerbaijan Province